Henry Nuttall (9 November 1897 – 30 April 1969) was an English footballer best known for being in the winning Bolton Wanderers team which won the FA Cup in 1923.

Nuttall was signed by Charles Foweraker for Bolton Wanderers in 1921.

References

1897 births
1969 deaths
Footballers from Bolton
English footballers
England international footballers
Bolton Wanderers F.C. players
Rochdale A.F.C. players
FA Cup Final players
Association footballers not categorized by position